The Azad Jammu and Kashmir 2019–20 was the government budget of Azad Jammu and Kashmir for the fiscal year beginning 1 July 2019.

It was presented by the finance and planning minister, Dr. Najeeb Naqi, on 18 June 2019 at the Azad Jammu and Kashmir Assembly with a total outlay of ₨. 121 bln.

References 

Pakistani budgets
federal budget
federal budget